Oecanthus argentinus, the prairie tree cricket, is a species of tree cricket in the family Gryllidae. It is found in North America and South America.

References

argentinus
Orthoptera of North America
Orthoptera of South America
Insects described in 1874
Taxa named by Henri Louis Frédéric de Saussure
Articles created by Qbugbot